Javier Ribalta is a Spanish football manager who is the director of OM.

Career

Ribalta has worked in Italy, England, Russia, and France.

References

Expatriate football managers in England
Expatriate football managers in France
Expatriate football managers in Italy
Juventus F.C. non-playing staff
Living people
Manchester United F.C. non-playing staff
Olympique de Marseille non-playing staff
Spanish expatriate sportspeople in England
Spanish expatriate sportspeople in France
Spanish expatriate sportspeople in Italy
Spanish football managers